The Brochet MB.100 was a three-seat light aircraft developed in France in the early 1950s.

Design and development
A further derivative of the Brochet MB.70, the MB.100 uses essentially the same airframe as the MB.80, but with a revised tail and cabin, the latter now including a third seat. Service de l'Aviation Légère et Sportive purchased several examples for distribution to French aeroclubs, including a number of tropicalised versions for use in North Africa. Unlike its predecessors, the MB.100 was not designed for homebuilding.

Variants
 MB.100 - initial production version (7 built)
 MB.101 - tropicalised version with engine air filter and more durable exterior finish (14 built)

Specifications (MB.100)

References

 
 
 
 
 

1950s French sport aircraft
Brochet aircraft
High-wing aircraft
Single-engined tractor aircraft
Aircraft first flown in 1951